Jaco Coetzee may refer to:
 Jaco Coetzee, born 1969, a South African rugby union player
 Jaco Coetzee, born 1970, a Namibian rugby union international
 Jaco Coetzee (rugby union, born 1996), a South African rugby union player